Bomboloni may refer to:

Bomboloni (pastry)
Bomboloni (album)